Leena Kapoor is an Indian model, and actress known for her works in Hindi cinema, and Malayalam Television. Before her debut in films, Leena has appeared in several Punjabi Music Videos, Television commercials and series such as "Love Net - Season 2" in Channel V.

Music videos

"Manka Manka" - Gurmukh Doabia

Movies 
madhu mast Barkhaa
 Salaam-e-Ishq

References

External links

Actresses in Hindi cinema
Year of birth missing (living people)
Living people